The Cadillac Calais was the entry-level Cadillac model that was sold from 1965 to 1976. Cadillac renamed its low-priced Series 62 in 1965 as the "Calais", after the French port city of Calais that overlooks the narrowest point in the English Channel. In Greek mythology, Calais was one of two winged sons of Boreas, god of the North Wind, and Oreithyea. With the exception of no convertible model, the Calais shared the same styling and mechanics as the better-equipped, more expensive Cadillac de Ville.

1965–1970

In 1965, Calais tailfins were canted slightly downward, and sharp, distinct body lines were featured. The rear bumper was straight and the rear lamp clusters were vertical. The headlight pairs were vertical, permitting a wide grille. Side windows were curved and frameless. Perimeter frame construction allowed positioning of the engine forward in the frame, thus lowering the transmission hump and increasing interior room. The Calais was available as a 2- or 4-door hardtop as well as a "formal-roof" 4-door sedan, which was a hybrid with frameless, hardtop-like windows, but with a pillar between them.

The primary differences between the Calais and the De Ville were trim levels and standard equipment. While the De Ville was delivered with such amenities as power windows and 2-way power seats as standard equipment, hand-cranked windows and manual seat adjusters were standard on the Calais, with power windows a US$119 option ($ in  dollars ) in 1965. At the same time, however, AM radio was a US$165 extra, as was air conditioning (More than 90% of Cadillac buyers ordered air conditioning), at US$495 ($ in  dollars ), on either. Standard equipment included power brakes; power steering; automatic transmission; cornering lights; dual back-up lights; windshield washers and dual speed wipers; full wheel covers; remote controlled outside rear view mirror; visor vanity mirror; oil filter; five tubeless blackwall tires; heater; defroster; lamps for  glove and rear passenger compartments  and front and rear seat belts.

Unlike the De Ville, the Calais did not offer leather seating areas and vinyl roof trim was not offered initially. A high-grade cloth and vinyl, similar to what was seen on top-line Buick Electras and Oldsmobile 98s, was standard. Another item not initially available on the Calais was the Cadillac-exclusive "firemist" paint, an extra-cost high gloss metallic paint. Both the high-end Buick and Oldsmobile models shared the GM C platform with Cadillac. Cadillac, always General Motors' technology leader, offered most De Ville options on the Calais, such as Twilight Sentinel and the GuideMatic headlight dimmer. In 1965, the new Turbo-Hydramatic, standard on the 1964 De Ville, but not the lower-priced Series 62, became standard throughout the Cadillac line, including the Calais. The   V8 also remained the standard engine.

Pricing of the Cadillac Calais started at nearly US$5,000 ($ in  dollars ), almost US$1,000 ($ in  dollars ) (or about 25%) more than the Electra 225 and Oldsmobile 98, and about US$500 ($ in  dollars ) more than the top-line Buick Riviera.

In 1966, changes included a somewhat coarser mesh for the radiator grille insert, which was now divided by a thick, bright metal horizontal center bar housing rectangular parking lamps at the outer ends. Separate rectangular side marker lamps replaced the integral grille extension designs. There was generally less chrome on all Cadillac models this year. Cadillac "firsts" this season included variable ratio steering and optional front seats with carbon cloth heating pads built into the cushions and seatbacks. Comfort and convenience innovations were headrests, reclining seats and an AM/FM stereo system. Automatic level control was available. Engineering improvements made to the perimeter frame increased ride and handling ease. Newly designed piston and oil rings and a new engine mounting system and patented quiet exhaust were used. Head rests became an option.

The Calais was extensively restyled for 1967. Prominent styling features were given a powerful frontal appearance with "forward-leaning" front end, long sculptured body lines, and redefined rear fenders that had more than just a hint of tail fins in them. The full-width forward-thrust "eggcrate" grille was flanked by dual stacked headlights for the third consecutive year. The squarer cornered grille insert had blades that seemed to emphasize its vertical members and it appeared both above the bumper and through a horizontal slot cut into it. Rectangular parking lamps were built into the outer edges of the grille. Rear end styling revisions were highlighted by metal divided taillamps and a painted lower bumper section. For 1967, power windows became standard on the Calais line, although power seats were still optional even in the 1970s models. Coupes got a new roofline, inspired by the Florentine show car created for the 1964 New York World's Fair, that gave rear seat passengers added privacy. As on that show car, the quarter window glass retracted rearward into a sail panel. New standard Calais features included non-glare rear-view mirror, electric clock, Automatic Climate Controls, padded dashboard, Hazard Warning system, outboard seatbelt retractors and rear cigarette lighters in all styles. A slide-out fuse box and safety front seat back lock for two-door models were additional Cadillac advances for the 1967 model year. Technical improvements included a revised engine valve train, different carburetor, Mylar printed circuit instrument panel, re-tuned body mounts, and a new engine fan with clutch for quieter operation. An energy absorbing steering column became optional. 1967 was the last model year for pillared sedans.

For 1968, grilles had an insert with finer mesh and step down outer section which held the rectangular parking lights slightly higher than before. Front and rear side marker lights were mandatory, beginning this year. Rear end styling was modestly altered with the deck lid having more of a rake. The hood was re-designed to accommodate recessed windshield wiper-washers, which now came with three speeds standard. Of 20 exterior paint color combinations, 14 were totally new. On the inside, enriched appointments included molded inner door panels with illuminated reflectors and a selection of 147 upholstery combinations, 76 in cloth, 67 in leather and four in vinyl. New standard features included a Light Group, a Mirror Group, a trip odometer and an ignition key warning buzzer. Like all other Cadillacs, the Calais received the  OHV V8 in 1968. 1968 was also the last year for the "stacked" dual headlights, which were replaced with horizontal dual headlights in 1969. 1968 was also the last year for vent windows.  Shoulder belts became standard for both driver and right front passenger seating positions on all Cadillacs (except convertibles) built effective January 1, 1968.

In 1969, the Calais was restyled. A new front fender treatment similar to the Eldorado  helped to emphasize a stronger horizontal design line. Rear quarters were extended to give the car a longer look.  Dual horizontal headlamps were positioned in the outboard step down areas of the all-new grille. The roofline was squarer and the rear deck and bumper more sculptured. A new ventilation system eliminated the need for vent windows, which provided a longer sleeker look and improved visibility. New standard features included front center seat armrests.
Front seat headrests were now mandatory and the ignition switch was moved from the instrument panel to the steering column, which locked both the steering wheel and transmission selector lever when the key was removed. 

In 1970, a facelift included  a grille with 13 vertical blades set against a delicately cross-hatched rectangular opening. The bright metal headlamp surrounds were bordered with body color to give a more refined look. Narrow vertical taillamps were seen again and had smaller bottom lenses pointing downward in the bumper. Standard wheel covers and winged crest fender tip emblems were new. Exterior distinctions came from a Calais signature script above the rear end of the horizontal belt molding just ahead of the taillight dividers and from the use of small square back-up light lenses set into the lower bumper as opposed to the long rectangular lenses used on the De Ville. The traditional 'V' emblem beneath the Cadillac crest on the hood and decklid was removed from both the Calais and De Ville this year, not to return until 1972.

1971–1976

For 1971, all Cadillac models including the Calais were completely restyled, inside and out. The new 1971 GM full-size bodies, at 64.3" front shoulder room (62.1" on Cadillac) and 63.4" rear shoulder room (64.0" on Cadillac) set a record for interior width that would not be matched by any car until the full-size GM rear-wheel drive models of the early to mid-1990s. Pairs of individually housed round headlamps were wider apart, with a winged Cadillac crest set between each pair. The V-shaped grille had an eggcrate style insert and was protected by massive vertical guards framing a rectangular license plate indentation. A wide hood with full-length windsplints, a prominent center crease and recessed windshield wipers was used. A larger Cadillac crest (again, minus the traditional 'V' emblem) decorated the hood face and new optional fiber-optic lamp indicators were placed atop each front fender. A horizontal beltline molding ran from behind the front wheel housing, almost to the rear stopping where an elliptical bulge in the body came to a point and where thin rectangular side markers were placed above and below the chrome strip. The rear wheel openings were again covered by fender skirts. New vertical taillamps were no longer divided by a chrome bar. Long horizontal back-up lamps were set in the bumper, on either side of a deeply recessed license plate housing. Interiors were redesigned featuring a new curved instrument panel available with brushed aluminum trim. Revised seating areas featured either standard cloth or optional vinyl upholstery.

In 1972, a minor facelift placed more emphasis on horizontal grille blades. The parking lamps were moved from the bumper to between the square bezeled headlamps, which were now set wider apart. After a two year absence, the traditional 'V' emblem was restored to the hood and deck lid. New standard features included a bumper impact system, automatic parking brake release, passenger assist straps and flow through ventilation system.

New energy absorbing bumpers were seen on all GM cars in 1973. Styling refinements to the Calais included a wider grille with an intricate eggcrate design. Larger vertical rectangles housed the parking lamps between wide spaced headlamps which had square bezels but round lenses. Bumpers ran fully across the front and wrapped around each end. Vertical guards were spaced much further apart at a point outboard of the grille. The rear end had a bumper with a flatter upper section housing an angled license plate recess. Border outline moldings vertically "veed" paralleled the fender edge shape at the rear bodysides. Single horizontally mounted rectangular rear side marker lamps were placed over and under the rear tip of the thin beltline trim. 'Cadillac' script was seen on the front fender sides below the belt molding behind the wheel opening; 'Calais' script appeared on the lower right of the deck lid. Interior seating was revised this year, featuring standard cloth or optional vinyl upholstery. Also new were "soft-pillow" door panels with larger, sturdier pull-straps.

In 1974, a wider eggcrate grille was used. Dual round headlamps were mounted close together in square bezels. Further outboard were double deck wraparound turn signal/parking lamps. Shorter vertical grille guards appeared in about the same position as before. Rear fendersides were flatter without the elliptical bulge. The thin beltline molding was positioned lower by several inches. The rear end had vertical chrome bumper ends with integrated side-marker lights. New horizontal taillamps and back-up lamps were positioned beneath the trunk lid. Both bumpers, especially the rear, protruded further from the body.  Coupes were no longer hardtops, instead sporting large wide "coach" windows giving a thick center pillar look. A new, two-tiered,  "space-aged" curved instrument panel housed a new standard quartz controlled digital clock. Other standard features included a removable litter receptacle and bias belted blackwall tires.

1974 also saw the introduction of the industry's first airbag system, the optional GM "Air Cushion Restraint System".  This option provided protection for front seat occupants in the case of a frontal collision. One airbag was located in the steering wheel hub, while the other sat in place of the glove compartment on the lower passenger side of the dashboard. The glove box was replaced with a rectangular storage compartment, complete with a lockable wood-tone hinged front panel, centrally located under the dashboard. Additionally, there was a driver's side knee bolster panel with an ashtray to the right of the steering column and a small hinged-door storage compartment on the left side.
Although the "ACRS" system (also available on top of the line  Buick and Oldsmobile models) saved lives, the option was quite expensive and therefore unpopular with customers. It was discontinued after 1976, and Cadillac would not offer airbags again until the 1990 model year. 

Styling changes for 1975 included a new hood with sharper lines; dual rectangular headlamps flanked by rectangular turn signal/parking lights wrapped around squared-off front fenders resulted in a more unified front-end appearance. A new cross hatched grille also appeared with Cadillac script on the header. Sedans now featured slim fixed triangular quarter windows. New standard equipment included the lamp monitor system, power door locks, high energy ignition and steel-belted radial tires. The big  engine, an Eldorado exclusive since 1970, was now standard in all Cadillacs except the new, smaller Seville. Vinyl seating areas were of the same configuration since 1973; Cloth upholstery was available in more colors.

In 1976, the grille saw a new finer crosshatching pattern. Cornering lamps received new horizontal silver trim, while taillamps bezels also gained chrome-like trim. Eight different color accent stripes were available. Optional padded vinyl roof coverings were now stamped with an Elk grain pattern. Vinyl seats were continued and new interior trim included plaids, plush velours and knits. Coupe models equipped with the available cabriolet vinyl top, covering the rear-half of the roof, were trimmed with a lower molding that served as a continuation of the door "belt" molding. A Controlled (limited-slip) Differential was included for extra traction. An optional illuminated entry and theft deterrent system was available. A new Delco Freedom battery never needed water. Simulated wire wheel covers were newly available. Other new options included a push-button Weather Band built into the AM/FM stereo signal-seeking radio, plus power passenger and manual driver seatback recliners for 50/50 front seats. Of the 15 standard and six optional Firemist body colors, 13 were new this year. New standard features included Soft-Ray tinted glass, spare tire cover, trunk mat,  washer fluid level indicator, and steel belted radial whitewall tires.

1976 was the 11th and final year for the Cadillac Calais. Sales of the Calais had never been strong and had been declining steadily since the introduction of the model in 1965; the difference in cost between the entry-level Calais and the base De Ville had become basically negligible, and Cadillac customers saw little reason to purchase a Calais, when a better equipped De Ville cost only slightly more. For 1977, the Cadillac De Ville and Fleetwood would be extensively redesigned and downsized; prices would also increase significantly.

References

Calais
Full-size vehicles
Rear-wheel-drive vehicles
Coupés
Sedans
1970s cars
Cars introduced in 1965
Motor vehicles manufactured in the United States